is a Japanese footballer currently playing as a midfielder for Yokohama FC.

Career statistics

Club
.

Notes

References

External links

2001 births
Living people
Association football people from Kanagawa Prefecture
Japanese footballers
Association football midfielders
J1 League players
Yokohama FC players